The Cady Way Trail is a  rail trail in the Orlando, Florida area opened in 1994. It is partly owned by the Orlando Department of Families, Parks and Recreation and partly by Orange County Parks and Recreation. The project was awarded a $1,750,000 Transportation Enhancement grant by the Federal Highway Administration and the Florida Department of Transportation, and a $483,000 grant from the Florida Department of Environmental Protection.

Location
The Cady Way Trail was constructed along the abandoned roadbed of the East Florida & Atlantic Railroad, which ran to the Naval Training Center Orlando. Its south end is at Orlando Fashion Square, and its north end is at Hall Road at Aloma Avenue in Goldenrod at the Seminole County line. Departing south from Hall Road, the trail passes Goldenrod Park, crosses State Road 436 via a bridge opened in November 2006, then passes Cady Way Park, Ward Park, Brookshire Elementary School, Winter Park High School, the former Naval Training Center Orlando (now the community of Baldwin Park) and the Winter Pines Golf Club. Part of the trail also passes through the city of Winter Park.

The second phase of construction connected the Cady Way Trail with the Cross Seminole Trail and Little Econ Greenway.

Trail homicide
Hector Rodriguez and Jesse Davis murdered Nicholas Presha and Jeremy Stewart in April 2012 along the Cady Way Trail. Davis pleaded guilty to murder charges in November 2012  and was sentenced to two concurrent life terms. Both sides rested in the case against Rodriguez on July 30, 2012. Rodriguez guilty on all counts, including kidnapping, robbery and first degree murder. He was sentenced to life in prison.

References

External links 
 Orange County Parks and Recreation - Cady Way Trail
 TrailLink.com - Cady Way Trail
 Map of Cady Way Trail
 Cady Way Trail at BikeOrlando.net

Bike paths in Florida
Geography of Orlando, Florida
Hiking trails in Florida
Protected areas of Orange County, Florida
Rail trails in Florida
Transportation in Orange County, Florida
Transportation in Orlando, Florida
Winter Park, Florida
Protected areas established in 1984
1994 establishments in Florida